Finlay Wood is a Welsh football midfielder. He currently plays for San José State University.

Career
Wood is a product of the Newport County academy. He made his senior debut for Newport in a 1–0 defeat to Yeovil Town in League Two on 15 October 2016 as a second-half substitute. Wood made his first appearance in the Newport starting line-up on 21 December 2016 in the FA Cup 2nd round replay versus Plymouth Argyle.

On 9 May 2017, Wood was released by Newport at the end of the 2016–17 season.

Career statistics
.

References

External links

Living people
Footballers from Newport, Wales
Welsh footballers
English Football League players
Association football midfielders
Newport County A.F.C. players
Year of birth missing (living people)